The qualification phase for the 2009 African Championship of Nations began in March 2008. These games did not count towards the FIFA rankings.

The inaugural edition of the competition featured eight teams.

North zone (1 seat)

Preliminary Round

|}

First Round

                        

|}

Second Round

|}

  qualified to CHAN - Côte d'Ivoire 2009.

Zone West A  (1 seat) 
Preliminary Round

|}

First Round

                        

|}

Second Round

                        
|}

 qualified to the CHAN - Côte d'Ivoire 2009.

Zone West B  (1 seat) 

Preliminary Round

|}

First Round

|}

Second Round

                        
|}

 qualified to CHAN - Côte d'Ivoire 2009.

Central Zone (1 seat) 
Preliminary Round

      

|}
The Chadian Football Federation was suspended by CAF following a similar suspension by the FIFA due to the country's violation of the article guaranteeing the independence of FIFA member associations. Thus, the Chad national team was disqualified.

First Round

                        

|}

Second Round

                        
|}

 qualified to CHAN - Côte d'Ivoire 2009.

Southern Zone  (2 seats) 

Preliminary Round

 

|}

First Round

                   

|}

Second Round

 and  qualified to CHAN - Côte d'Ivoire 2009.

Central East Zone  (1 seat) 
Preliminary Round

  
 
                     
|}

First Round

|}

Second Round

                        
|}

 qualified to CHAN - Côte d'Ivoire 2009.

References 

Qualification
African Nations Championship qualification